USS Hammond may refer to more than one United States Navy ship:

 , an ocean escort, later reclassified as a frigate, in commission from 1970 to 1992

United States Navy ship names